Christine Ayo Achen also known as Achen Christine Ayo (born 7 July 1983) is a Ugandan politician and administrator. She is the district woman representative of Alebtong in the 10th parliament of Uganda. She is affiliated to the National Resistance Movement ruling political party. She was also the aspiring Woman MP for the period 2021–2026 in Alebtong.

Education 
Christine holds a diploma in development studies from Nzamizi Training Institute of social development.

Career history 
She is the Member of Parliament at the Parliament of Uganda since 2016 to-date. She serves on additional role as the member of the committee on Gender Labour and Social Development and PAC local government at the Parliament of Uganda. She is the member of Uganda Women Parliamentary Association of the 10th Parliament of Uganda. Ahead of 2021 general elections, she had a competitor for Alebtong District Woman MP seat, Ms Barbra Akech.

She was among the MPs who voted yes to the second reading of the Constitution Amendment Bill in 2017.

Personal life 
She is married. She is an Anglican by faith.

See also 
 List of members of the tenth Parliament of Uganda
 Parliament of Uganda
 Alebtong District
 National Resistance Movement

References

External links 
 Achen Christine Ayo on Twitter
 Achen Christine Ayo on Facebook

Living people
1983 births
National Resistance Movement politicians
Members of the Parliament of Uganda
Women members of the Parliament of Uganda
People from Alebtong District
Northern Region, Uganda